This article covers the 2006 season of the Sydney Swans AFL team.

News 
For the full text of these news items, see SydneySwans.com Club News
 30 September 2006: The Sydney Swans go down to the West Coast Eagles in the Grand Final by only one point.
 25 September 2006: Adam Goodes wins his second Brownlow Medal with 26 votes, 3 votes ahead of Scott West of the Western Bulldogs.
 22 September 2006: Sydney win the 1st Preliminary Final by beating a plucky Fremantle 19.13 (127) to 14.8 (92) at Telstra Stadium, and will now play for the 2006 AFL premiership at the MCG on 30 September, against the West Coast Eagles.
 9 September 2006: Sydney win their qualifying final by beating West Coast at Subiaco, gaining a week off and a home preliminary final.
 8 September 2006: Jared Crouch admits he was playing with a chronic ankle injury, a broken collarbone, and hamstring and lower back problems
 31 August 2006: Swans defender Tadhg Kennelly will wear the red and white for a further three seasons
 11 July 2006: Paul Williams announces he needs season ending shoulder surgery. With his previous announcement, he is now retired after 306 games and 306 goals with Collingwood and Sydney
 1 July 2006: Jared Crouch's unbroken run of games from his debut in 1998 comes to an end due to injury (and does not play for the rest of the season)
 21 June 2006: Paul Williams announces he will retire at the end of the season after 16 seasons playing first for Collingwood and then Sydney
 8 March 2006: Tadhg Kennelly injures his shoulder at training and will miss the first two or three weeks of the season
 22 February 2006: At the Australian Sport Awards for 2005, the Swans wins the National Team of the Year award while Paul Roos takes home Coach of the Year award
 19 December 2005: Swans assign guernsey numbers
 16 December 2005: Swans name three skippers
 13 December 2005: Swans draft 8 rookies

Captains 
On 16 December 2005, the Sydney Swans announced they would use three captains over the season, following on from the 2005 season, where they rotated among six captains after Stuart Maxfield resigned from the captaincy. The three captains are Barry Hall, Brett Kirk and Leo Barry. The captaincy will not be rotated, but each will be captain in each game.

Club list 
The 2006 squad consisted of the following players. The list was finalised in December 2005 following a 2nd list lodgement on 18 November, the NAB AFL Draft on 26 November, NAB AFL Pre-season Draft and Rookie Draft on 14 December.

Player list 

Statistics are as of 15 May 2006, after Round 7.

Rookie list

Changes from 2005 list

Additions 
 Exchange period – received:
 Paul Chambers (Geelong)
 Ted Richards (Essendon)

 Rookie elevation:
 Heath Grundy
 Earl Shaw
 Luke Vogels

 Father/son selection:
 None
 NAB AFL Draft (26 November 2005):
 Matthew Laidlaw (Round 4; Overall pick 51; from Oakleigh Chargers)
 Kristin Thornton (Round 4; Overall pick 54; from Peel Thunder)
 Ryan Brabazon (Round 4; Overall pick 59; from Claremont (WAFL))

 NAB AFL Pre-Season Draft:
 NAB AFL Rookie Draft (13 December 2005):
 Simpkin, Jonathan (Pick 16; from Geelong Falcons)
 Wall, James (Pick 32; from Calder Cannons)
 Currie, Paul (Pick 45; from Northern Knights)
 Phillips, Simon (Pick 54; from Sandringham Dragons)
 Jack, Kieran (Pick 57; from NSW-ACT Rams)
 Barlow, Ed (Pick 58; from Oakleigh Chargers)
 Prior, Adam (Pick 59; from Murray Bushrangers)
 Rowe, Sam (Pick 60; from Murray Bushrangers)

Deletions 
 Retired:
 Jason Ball
 Heath James
 Stuart Maxfield
 Matthew Nicks
 Andrew Schauble

 Exchange period – traded:
 Mark Powell (to Kangaroos)
 Jason Saddington (to Carlton)

 Delisted:
 Ben Fixter
 Jarrad Sundqvist
 Guy Campbell (rookie)
 Ed Clarke (rookie)
 Andrew Hayes (rookie)
 Nick Potter (rookie)

 Pre-season Draft:
 Ben Fixter (to Brisbane Lions)

Games

Exhibition and trial games 

1: Exhibition game as part of Australia week in the USA
2: NAB Regional Challenge game

NAB Cup

Home and away

Finals

See also 
 2006 AFL season

Sydney Swans seasons
Sydney Swans Season, 2006
Sydney Swans Season, 2006